Original Flavor was an American hip hop group in the early- to mid-1990s. The group originally consisted of Ski and Suave Lover. They released two albums—This Is How It Is (1992) and Beyond Flavor (1994). On Beyond Flavor, Suave Lover was replaced by T-Strong and DJ Chubby Chub.

The group had a hit with the song "Can I Get Open," which reached #46 on the Billboard Maxi Singles chart. This track prominently features Jay-Z. The group, managed by Damon Dash and cousin Darien Dash, disbanded after it released Beyond Flavor but Ski went on to work with Roc-A-Fella Records, producing four tracks on Jay-Z's debut album Reasonable Doubt.

Discography
This Is How It Is (Atlantic Records, 1992)
Beyond Flavor (Atlantic, 1994) U.S. R#B #85

References

East Coast hip hop groups
Atlantic Records artists